Panyu Prison is a prison in Huijiang Village, Dashi Subdistrict, Panyu District, Guangzhou, Guangdong Province, China.

History
The prison began accepting inmates in 1997.

Inmate population
The prison reportedly began taking foreign inmates in 2009, and by 2013 housed "more than 100 foreign inmates".

Transport
Panyu Prison is located a short walk south of Huijiang station, served by Line 2 of the Guangzhou Metro.

See also
 List of prisons in Guangdong

References

External links 
  (not secure)

1997 establishments in China
Panyu District
Prisons in Guangdong
Buildings and structures in Guangzhou